Knox Summerour is a L.A. Emmy-winning film & TV composer, jazz trumpeter, and vocalist.

In the 2011 Polybona Films/Paramount film remake of What Women Want (Beijing), Knox sings and plays two of his original songs (one co-written with the film composer Christopher O'Young), featured in the film starring Andy Lau and Gong Li.  Knox' solo trumpet work is featured in Ning Hao's upcoming film No Man's Land and can be heard on many Hollywood films and TV shows.

Knox has also worked as co-musical director and conductor for Lin Yu Chun.  In 2010 Knox worked with Leehom Wang on his film Love In Disguise alongside film composer Nathan Wang.

Knox received his Bachelor of Music degree from Berklee College of Music in Boston, MA, and also holds a Master's degree in Music from the University of Georgia where he was a pupil of Fred Mills (1935–2009).

References 
Interview - Knox Summerour circa 2007 at the Grill- Athens, GA 22 coclocks

External links 
 knoxsummerour.com
 

Year of birth missing (living people)
Living people
Emmy Award winners
American jazz composers
American jazz trumpeters
American male trumpeters
American male singers
Berklee College of Music alumni
University of Georgia alumni
21st-century trumpeters
American male jazz composers
21st-century American male musicians